James Cotter may refer to:
 Sir James Fitz Edmond Cotter (c. 1630–1705), soldier and colonial governor
 Sir James Cotter, 1st Baronet (1714–1770), Irish politician and baronet
 Sir James Cotter, 3rd Baronet (1782–1834), Anglo-Irish politician and baronet
 James Cotter the Younger (1689–1720)
 James Cotter (judge) (1772–1849), farmer, judge and political figure in Upper Canada 
 James Cotter (politician) (1869–1948), New Zealand politician
 James Cotter (rugby union) (1907–1991), Scottish rugby union player

See also
 Cotter Baronets for others of this name
Jim Cotter (disambiguation)